This is a list of notable people educated at Ampleforth College in Yorkshire, England.

Arts, entertainment, writing
Michael Abney-Hastings, 14th Earl of Loudoun (1942–2012), British-Australian farmer made famous in the documentary Britain's Real Monarch
Peter Bergen (born 1962), author, print and TV journalist, CNN, adjunct professor, Johns Hopkins University
Ian Birrell, former Deputy Editor-in-Chief, The Independent; Contributing Editor, The Mail on Sunday
Mark Burns (1936–2007), actor
John Bunting (1927–2002), sculptor and teacher
Mark Coreth (born 1959), animal sculptor
Lord Anthony Crichton-Stuart (born 1961), art historian
Vincent Cronin (1924–2011), historical writer and biographer
Lu Edmonds (born 1957), musician (Public Image Ltd., The Damned, The Mekons, The Spizzles, The Waterboys, among others)
Rupert Everett (born 1959), actor
Mark Ezra (born 1950), film producer and writer
Julian Fellowes, Baron Fellowes of West Stafford (born 1949), actor, writer and creator of Downton Abbey; Conservative peer of the House of Lords (2011–)
Andrew Festing (born 1941), British Royal Portrait painter
Sir Antony Gormley (born 1950), sculptor
Harman Grisewood (1906–1997), Chief Assistant to the Director-General of the BBC, 1955–1964
Albert Read, newspaper and magazine executive for Condé Nast
Patrick Reyntiens (born 1925), stained glass artist
Edward Holcroft (born 1987), film, television and stage actor
James Honeyborne (born 1970), TV and film director
Henry Hudson (born 1982), artist
Geoffrey Huskinson (1935–2018), cartoonist
Martin Jennings (born 1957), sculptor
Andrew Knight (born 1939), journalist, editor, and media magnate
Guy Mankowski (born 1983), writer
John Micklethwait (born 1962), editor-in-chief of The Economist
Red Morris, 4th Baron Killanin (born 1947), film producer
Paul Morrissey (born 1938), film director, best known for his association with Andy Warhol.
James Norton (born 1985), film, television and stage actor
James O'Brien (born 1972), radio presenter and journalist
Roderic O'Conor (1860–1940), artist
Herbert Railton (1857–1910), illustrator
Benedict Read, BA, FBA, (1945–2016), art historian, Senior Lecturer in Art History at the University of Leeds.  Brother of Piers Paul Read (see below).
Piers Paul Read (born 1941), writer
Stuart Reid (born 1942), journalist, pundit 
Joe Simpson (born 1960), mountaineer and autobiographer
Edward Stourton (born 1957), journalist
Julian Wadham (born 1958), actor
Tom Waller (born 1974), film producer
Michael Whitehall (born 1940), producer, agent, television personality; father of comedian Jack Whitehall
Hugo Young (1938–2003), journalist

Politics, law, business and nobility
Michael Ancram, 14th Marquess of Lothian (born 1945), Deputy Leader of the Conservative Party, 2001–2005
Dominic Asquith (born 1957), Ambassador to Iraq, 2006—2007, Ambassador to Egypt, 2007–present.
Julian Asquith, 2nd Earl of Oxford and Asquith (1916–2011), diplomat
Raymond Asquith, 3rd Earl of Oxford and Asquith (born 1952), former diplomat and businessman
Anthony Bamford, Lord Bamford (born 1945), Chairman, J.C.Bamford (Excavators) Ltd.
Andrew Bertie (1929–2008), first British Grand Master of the Knights Hospitaller since 1258 (1988–2008)
Richard Bertie, 14th Earl of Lindsey (born 1931), soldier and hereditary peer
John Burnett, Baron Burnett (born 1945), former Liberal Democrat MP for Torridge and West Devon, 1997–2001, 2001–5, Life Peer (2006–present)
John Crichton-Stuart, 6th Marquess of Bute (1933–1993), Chairman, Historic Buildings Council for Scotland, 1983–1988, and National Museums of Scotland, 1985–1993
Alexander Fermor-Hesketh, 3rd Baron Hesketh (born 1950), landowner and UKIP politician 
Matthew Festing (born 1949), second British Grand Master of the Knights Hospitaller since 1258 (2008–2017)
Edward Fitzalan-Howard, 18th Duke of Norfolk (born 1956), Earl Marshal
Major-General Miles Fitzalan-Howard, 17th Duke of Norfolk (1915–2002), Earl Marshal
Francis Fitzherbert, 15th Baron Stafford (born 1954), landowner, peer and deputy lieutenant 
Sir Hugh Fraser (1918–1984), Secretary of State for Air, 1962–1964
David Hennessy, 3rd Baron Windlesham (born 1932), Lord Privy Seal and Leader of the House of Lords, 1973–1974
Auberon Herbert (1922–1974), campaigner for Eastern European causes
Peter Kerr, 12th Marquess of Lothian (1922–2004), Scottish Peer, landowner and politician
John George (1930–2012), HM Kintyre Pursuivant of Arms, herald and author 
 Sir Arthur Goodall, GCMG (born 1931), British diplomat, High Commissioner to India 1987–1991.
Grand Duke Jean of Luxembourg (1921–2019), Grand Duke of Luxembourg, 1964–2000
Don Agustín Jerónimo de Iturbide y Huarte (1807–1866), Prince Imperial of Mexico
King Letsie III of Lesotho (born 1963), King of Lesotho (1990–95, 1996–present)
Paul Moore, (born 1958), whistleblower sacked from HBOS
King Moshoeshoe II of Lesotho (1938–1996), King of Lesotho (1966–1970, 1970–1990, 1995–96)
George Nelson, 8th Earl Nelson (1905–1981)
Michael Nolan, Baron Nolan (1928–2007), Law Lord and first chairman of the Committee on Standards in Public Life, 
Richard Norton, 8th Baron Grantley (born 1956), banker and politician 
William Peel, 3rd Earl Peel (born 1947), Lord Chamberlain
Peter Hope, 4th Baron Rankeillour (1935–2005), Scottish landowner and peer
John Home Robertson (born 1948), former Labour MP and currently Member of the Scottish Parliament
John Scott, 4th Earl of Eldon (1899–1976)
John Scott, 5th Earl of Eldon (1937–2017)
Charles Stourton, 26th Baron Mowbray (1923–2006), a representative hereditary peer
Edward Stourton, 27th Baron Mowbray (1953–2021)
Sir Swinton Barclay Thomas (1931–2016), British judge, privy councillor, and the Interception of Communications Commissioner

Military
Michael Allmand (1923–1944), Victoria Cross recipient (posthumous). Killed In Action on 24 June 1944, in Burma
Brigadier Andrew Parker Bowles (born 1939), soldier
Brigadier Simon Fraser, 15th Lord Lovat (1911–1995), Pioneering officer of the British Army's commandos
Major General Lord Michael Fitzalan-Howard (1916–2007), Marshal of the Diplomatic Corps 1972–1981
Major-General Sir Freddie de Guingand (1900–1979), Chief of Staff to Field Marshal Montgomery, 1942–1945
Lieutenant-Colonel Sir John Johnston, GCVO, MC, Comptroller of the Lord Chamberlain's office
Captain Robert Nairac (1948–1977), George Cross, intelligence officer murdered by the Provisional Irish Republican Army
Major-General Peter Grant Peterkin (born c.1947), Sergeant at Arms of the House of Commons
Major General Sir Sebastian Roberts (born 1954), GOC The Household Division 2003–2007
Colonel Sir David Stirling (1915–1990), founder of the SAS

Philosophy, History and academia
Michael Clanchy (1936–2021), Professor of Medieval History, University of London
William Dalrymple (born 1965), historian
John Keay (born 1941), historian, journalist and radio presenter
Robert Maximilian de Gaynesford (born 1968), philosopher
Fred Halliday, (1946–2010), academic, Fellow of the British Academy, Montague Burton Professor of International Relations at London School of Economics
Philip Lawrence (1947–1995), headmaster and murder victim
Gabriel Turville-Petre (1908–1978), Professor of Ancient Icelandic Literature and Antiquities, University of Oxford, 1953–1975
Henry Wansbrough (1934), Master of St Benet's Hall, Oxford, 1990–2004

Religion
Athanasius Allanson (1804–1876), Benedictine monk, and Abbot of Glastonbury, 1874–1876
Thomas Burgess (1791–1854), Roman Catholic Bishop of Clifton, 1851–1854
Columba Cary-Elwes (1903–1994), monastery founder, ecumenist and author
Sheikh Abdur Raheem Green (born 1962), convert to Islam and founder of the iERA
Ambrose Griffiths (1928–2011), Bishop of Hexham and Newcastle
John Cuthbert Hedley (1837–1915), Roman Catholic Bishop of Newport, 1881–1915
Basil, Cardinal Hume (1923–1999), Abbot of Ampleforth Abbey, 1963–1975, and Archbishop of Westminster, 1975–1999

Science and medicine
Peter Christopher Caldwell FRS (1927–1979), zoologist
Thomas Cecil Gray (1913–2008), pioneered modern anaesthetic techniques
Bill Inman (1929–2005), pharmacovigilance pioneer
John Polidori (1795–1821), physician and writer

Sport
Christopher Bartle, FBHS, (born 1952) equestrian, member of the GB team at the 1984 Summer Olympics
John Bean (1913–2005), first-class cricketer and British Army officer
John Crichton-Stuart, 7th Marquess of Bute (1958–2021), a Scottish peer and former racing driver ("Johnny Dumfries")
Lawrence Dallaglio OBE (born 1972) former captain of the English national rugby team
John Dalrymple (born 1957), cricketer
Howard Dunbar (1904–1942), cricketer
Simon Easterby (born 1975) former member of the Ireland national rugby union team.
Guy Easterby (born 1972) former member of the Ireland national rugby union team.
Charles Grieve (1913–2000), cricketer who played for Oxford University and Guernsey
Edward O'Donovan Crean (born 1887), English rugby union player who was part of the first official British and Irish Lions team that toured South Africa in 1910
Jonathan Pearce (born 1957), cricketer

References

 
Ampleforth